Sathi Shakthi is a 1963 Indian Kannada-language film directed and produced by Kanagal Prabhakar Shastry. The film stars Rajkumar, Ramkumar, K. S. Ashwath and B. Raghavendra Rao. The film has musical score by T. G. Lingappa. Puttanna Kanagal assisted his brother during the shoot of this movie. This was the first movie in which Rajkumar played a dual role in full-fledged manner.

Rajkumar played the role of mantravaadi for the only time in his career in this movie. While Puttanna Kanagal and K. S. L. Swamy worked as assistant directors, Rajkumar's younger brother SP Varadaraj essayed a small role in the movie. The title card of the movie credited the story to have been inspired by Pampa Kshetra Mahatme.

Cast

Rajkumar as Rakthaaksha/Viroopaaksha (dual roles)
Ramkumar
K. S. Ashwath
B. Raghavendra Rao
Narasimharaju
Vijayarao
S. P. Varadaraj
K. Amaranath
H. Krishna Shastry
Vijayakumar
Swamy
Guggu
Ganapathi Bhat
Sorat Ashwath
Shivashankar
M. V. Rajamma
Sahukar Janaki
K. Pushpavalli
Sujatha
Papamma
B. Jaya
Lalitha Shastry

Soundtrack
The music was composed by T. G. Lingappa.

References

External links
 

1963 films
1960s Kannada-language films
Films scored by T. G. Lingappa